Katie Bowman may refer to:

Katie Bowman, character in Colony (TV series)
Katie Bowman, character in Roommates (TV series)

See also
 Katie Bouman (born 1989), American computer scientist